Paul Norman (born Paul Apstein, 1956) is an American former pornographic director who directed approximately 134 films from 1986 to 1999.

Career
Norman started his career making bisexual pornography. One of his earliest works in this genre is his Bi and Beyond series, which debuted in 1988. He later ventured towards establishing himself as a director of strictly straight pornography in the early 1990s. Norman was inducted into the AVN Hall of Fame in 1998.

Personal life
He married fellow pornographic actress Tori Welles in 1990, before divorcing in 1994. They had two sons, Nicolas and Joshua. He was a friend of the late pornographic director Fred J. Lincoln. Norman was later married to fellow pornographic actress Celeste 1995–1996. The relationship produced one child.

Awards
 1990 AVN Award - Best Director: Bisexual Video (Bi and Beyond III)
 1991 AVN Award - Best Director: Bisexual Video (Bi and Beyond IV)
 1998 AVN Hall of Fame inductee.

References

External links
 
 
 

1956 births
Living people
American pornographic film directors
Directors of bisexual pornographic films
Jewish American male actors
Place of birth missing (living people)
21st-century American Jews